Miss Universe 2014 was the 63rd Miss Universe pageant, held at the FIU Arena in Florida, United States on January 25, 2015. This was the first time in the history of the competition that the pageant was not during the year the title was awarded for. However, the pageant was still known as the 2014 pageant.

At the end of the event, Gabriela Isler of Venezuela crowned Paulina Vega of Colombia as Miss Universe 2014. It is Colombia's first victory in 56 years, and the second victory of the country in the pageant's history.

Contestants from 88 countries and territories participated in this year's pageant. The pageant was hosted by Thomas Roberts and Natalie Morales, with Jeannie Mai as backstage correspondent. Prince Royce, Nick Jonas, and Gavin DeGraw performed in this year's pageant.

The competition also featured the debut of the new DIC Crown, which is composed of 311 diamonds, 5 pieces of blue topaz, 198 pieces of blue sapphire, 33 pieces of heat—fired crystals, and 220 grams of 18k karat white gold. The crown is said to be worth $300,000.

Background

Location and date 

Negotiations between the Secretary of Tourism of Ceará in Brazil and the Miss Universe Organization began in late September 2013, when the Miss Universe Organization directors flew to Fortaleza to begin conversations and arrangement of pageant activities. Bismarck Maia, State Secretary of Tourism, disclosed the latest development to Fortaleza's market-leading newspaper, Diário do Nordeste, on January 11, 2014, announcing that the event will be at Centro de Eventos do Ceará, in Ceará's capital.

On March 27, 2014, Annette Cammer, Miss Universe Organization's national licensing director, responded through e-mail to a question by a national directive that the 2014 Miss Universe pageant will not be hosted in Ceará's capital, as promised and stated by local authorities. On May 20, 2014, Fortaleza's bid was formally retired, and the Miss Universe Organization was considering four other Brazilian cities as a replacement: Rio de Janeiro, Ribeirão Preto, Porto Alegre and Manaus.

On August 22, 2014, Donald Trump posted to Twitter that Miami and other cities were "fighting hard to host the Miss Universe pageant" and that an announcement would be made soon; specifically mentioning the city of Miami prompted many pageant watchers to believe that the pageant was headed for the Floridian city for the first time since 1997. On September 9, 2014, Puerto Rican newspaper, El Nuevo Dia, and Venezuelan newspaper, El Nacional, each printed an article that said that the contestants would be staying at a Trump-owned hotel in Miami; further fueling rumors that the pageant would be held in Miami in December.

On September 12, 2014, Luigi Boria, mayor of Doral, Florida, announced via Twitter that the pageant was going to take place in Doral on January 18, 2015, leading to some controversy among pageant fans. This was confirmed in late September. In early October, an announcement was released on the official website of Miss Universe stating that the pageant is will take place at the FIU Arena in Miami on January 25, 2015.

Selection of participants 
Contestants from 88 countries and territories were selected to compete in the competition. Six of these delegates were appointees to their national titles, while seven were selected to replace the original dethroned winner.

Camille Cerf, Miss France 2015, was appointed as Miss Universe France 2014 after Flora Coquerel, Miss France 2014, will only compete at Miss World 2014 due to the conflicting schedules of the two pageants. Coquerel competed in the pageant the following year. Marcela Chmielowska, the second runner-up of Miss Polonia 2011, was appointed as Miss Universe Poland 2014, due to the rescheduling of the Miss Polonia 2014 pageant in December 2014.

Laurence Langen, Miss Belgium 2014, was replaced by her first runner-up, Anissa Blondin, due to problems with the Miss Belgium Organization. Nora Xu, Miss Universe China 2014, originally was supposed to represent China at Miss Universe. However, Xu preferred to continue with her studies instead of competing in the pageant. Due to this, Hu Yanliang, first runner-up at Miss Universe China 2014, replaced Xu as Miss Universe China 2014. Arnela Zeković, first runner-up at Miss Serbia 2013, was replaced by Anđelka Tomašević as the representative of Serbia at Miss Universe due to personal reasons. Carolyne Bernard, Miss Universe Tanzania 2014, originally was supposed to represent Tanzania at Miss Universe. However, Bernard withdrew after fracturing her feet in a car accident. Due to this, Nale Boniface, second runner-up of Miss Universe Tanzania 2014, replaced Bernard as the representative of Tanzania in Miss Universe.

Rolene Strauss, Miss South Africa 2014, was expected to compete at the Miss Universe and Miss World pageants. However, after winning Miss World 2014, Strauss was ineligible to compete for Miss Universe 2014. Ziphozakhe Zokufa, first runner-up of Miss South Africa 2014, replaced Strauss as the representative of South Africa in Miss Universe. Weluree Ditsayabut, Miss Universe Thailand 2014, was replaced by her first runner-up, Pimbongkod Chankaew, after calling for the supporters of the Prime Minister of Thailand to be executed. Diana Harkusha, second runner-up of Miss Ukraine Universe 2014, was appointed as the representative of Ukraine at Miss Universe after Anna Andres, Miss Ukraine Universe 2014, resigned due to personal reasons.

The 2014 edition saw the returns of Albania, Egypt, Georgia, Ireland, Kenya, Kosovo, Portugal, Saint Lucia, and Uruguay. Kenya last competed in 2005, Egypt and Portugal last competed in 2011, while the others last competed in 2012. Azerbaijan, Botswana, Denmark, Estonia, Namibia, Romania, and Vietnam withdrew. Nguyễn Lâm Diễm Trang, the second runner-up of Miss Vietnam 2014, was appointed to represent Vietnam at Miss Universe but withdrew at the last minute due to lack of time to prepare for the pageant. Azerbaijan, Botswana, Denmark, Estonia, Namibia, and Romania withdrew after their respective organizations failed to hold a national competition or appoint a delegate.

Results

Placements

Special awards

Best National Costume

Pageant

Format 
The Miss Universe Organization introduced several changes to the format for this edition. The number of semifinalists was reverted to 15— the same number of semifinalists in 2010. The results of the preliminary competition— which consisted of the swimsuit and evening gown competition, and the closed-door interview, determined the 15 semifinalists. The Top 15 participated in the swimsuit competition, with 10 advancing in the competition for the evening gown competition. From ten, five contestants will participate in the question and answer portion, and the final look.

Selection committee

Preliminary competition 
 Lloyd Boston – Fashion guru, TV host and regular correspondent on NBC's The Today Show and CBS's The Insider
 Azucena Cierco – Latina actress, TV host and special correspondent at Telemundo, particularly her hosting stint at Un Nuevo Dia
 Jeneine Doucette-White – New York bureau manager at Access Hollywood
 Michelle McLean – Miss Universe 1992 from Namibia
 Jimmy Nguyen – Prominent entertainment and digital media lawyer, diversity advocate, blogger and technology adviser
 Corinne Nicolas – President of Trump Models Modelling Agency
 Tyler Tixier – Part of the sales team of Delta Air Lines, dubbed as the World's Best Airline

Final telecast 
 Kristin Cavallari – American actress, TV personality, fashion designer
 William Levy – Cuban American model and actor, previously named People en Español's Sexiest Man Alive
 Manny Pacquiao – Filipino world champion professional boxer, Fighter of the Decade
 Louise Roe – English TV presenter, fashion journalist, host of MTV International's "Plain Jane", STAR World Asia's "Fit for Fashion"
 Lisa Vanderpump – Reality star of The Real Housewives of Beverly Hills
 Emilio Estefan – musician and producer
 DeSean Jackson – Washington Redskins wide receiver
 Nina Garcia – Creative Director of Marie Claire Magazine, Project Runway judge, and fashion industry expert
 Rob Dyrdek – Entrepreneur
 Giancarlo Stanton – Miami Marlins right fielder

Contestants 
88 contestants competed for the title.

Notes

References

Universe
2014
Beauty pageants in the United States
January 2015 events in the United States
2015 in Florida
Events in Miami